Guy Shrubsole is a British researcher, writer and campaigner. He wrote Who Owns England?: How We Lost Our Green and Pleasant Land, and How to Take It Back.

Life
Shrubsole was born in Newbury, Berkshire and attended St Bartholomew's School.

Work
He spent years researching who owns the land in England. In August 2020, Shrubsole and Nick Hayes launched a campaign on freedom to roam in England, called Right to Roam. In July 2021 he and Hayes collaborated with Landscapes of Freedom and David Bangs to organise a mass trespass on the Sussex Downs to raise awareness of the failings of the Countryside and Rights of Way Act 2000, which Shrubsole claims still only gives the public access to 8% of land and 3% of rivers in England.

He used to work as Policy and Campaigns Coordinator at Rewilding Britain.

Shrubsole's Lost Rainforests of Britain campaign attempts to find, map, photograph, and restore the
Atlantic Oakwood forests, woodlands variously referred to in Britain as Upland Oakwoods, Atlantic Oakwoods, Western Oakwoods, Temperate Rainforest, Caledonian forest, and colloquially as Celtic Rainforests.

Publications
Who Owns England?: How We Lost Our Green and Pleasant Land, and How to Take It Back. William Collins, 2019. .

See also
Land ownership in the United Kingdom

References

External links
 Who Owns England?, Shrubsole and Anna Powell-Smith's blog

21st-century British writers
Living people
Year of birth missing (living people)
People from Newbury, Berkshire